Norberto Javier Paparatto (born 3 January 1984) is a retired Argentine footballer who and current manager of Almagro.

Career
Paparatto started his career with Lanús in 2005, but he only made two appearances for the club before joining Tiro Federal of the Argentine 2nd division. In 2007, he made his return to the Primera División Argentina, joining Tigre and helping them achieve their best ever league finish of 2nd place in the Apertura 2007 tournament. In the 2011–2012 season, he helped Tigre once again achieve a 2nd-place finish in league. He also helped the club finish runners-up in the 2012 Copa Sudamericana. Paparatto was named Tigre’s captain ahead of the 2013-14 season.

On January 15, 2014, Paparatto signed with Major League Soccer (MLS) club Portland Timbers. He won the 2015 MLS Cup with the Timbers. In 2016, he played for Atlético de Rafaela and FC Dallas, although he made no official appearances for Dallas.

Coaching career
On 5 November 2021, Paparatto announced that he would retire at the end of the year. On 25 March 2022, he was appointed manager of Club Almagro, replacing Walter Perazzo.

Honours

Club
Portland Timbers
MLS Cup: 2015
Western Conference (playoffs): 2015

References

External links

 
 Football-Lineups player profile
 
 

1984 births
Living people
People from Adrogué
Argentine footballers
Argentine expatriate footballers
Association football defenders
Club Atlético Lanús footballers
Tiro Federal footballers
Club Atlético Tigre footballers
Atlético de Rafaela footballers
Club Atlético Mitre footballers
Club Almagro players
Portland Timbers players
Portland Timbers 2 players
FC Dallas players
Argentine Primera División players
Primera Nacional players
Major League Soccer players
USL Championship players
Argentine expatriate sportspeople in the United States
Expatriate soccer players in the United States
Sportspeople from Buenos Aires Province
Argentine football managers